WGFJ is a radio station located in Cross Hill, South Carolina. The station is licensed by the Federal Communications Commission (FCC) to broadcast on 105.1 FM with an ERP of 3,600 watts, serving the Greenwood, South Carolina area.  It simulcasts WLFJ-FM and its Christian Contemporary music format.

History
The station went on the air as WBDQ on July 17, 1998.  On May 4, 2001, the station changed its call sign to WCRS-FM.  On August 8, 2004 the station flipped to a CHR format under the WHZQ calls, using the name Q94.  Shortly after, the format was flipped to Country as 94.1 The Bull.  It simulcasted WCRS for a brief while as well as a Regional Mexican format in 2006 and 2007 after Peregon bought both stations from Pro-Com Communications LLC.

On August 9, 2007, the WYOR calls and the "Your 94" format was adopted with an Adult Contemporary format.  After being on and off in early 2009, the station became silent along with its sister stations in May 2009, although it remained licensed by the FCC.  In July 2009, the station filed to remain silent.

His Radio
In March 2010, His Radio WLFJ, based out of Greenville, SC had a successful fund raiser to purchase the station to enhance their signal in the area. The simulcast began in April 2010.

References

External links
Official Website for His Radio

GFJ
Radio stations established in 1998